Vladimir Galayba (born July 27, 1960) is a retired Russian professional footballer.

He played 2 games in the European Cup Winners' Cup 1986–87 for FC Torpedo Moscow.

Honours
 Soviet Cup finalist: 1982, 1988 (played in the early stages of the 1987/88 tournament for FC Torpedo Moscow).

External links
 Profile at playerhistory.com 

1960 births
Living people
Soviet footballers
Soviet expatriate footballers
Russian footballers
Russian expatriate footballers
Expatriate footballers in Sweden
FC Rostov players
FC Torpedo Moscow players
FC SKA Rostov-on-Don players
IFK Luleå players
Association football midfielders